Trichospermum javanicum is a Southeast Asian plant species in the family Malvaceae. It is found in Malaysia, Indonesia, and Thailand, and is locally used for its timber.

References

Flora of Indo-China
javanicum